Metepeira ventura is a species of orb weaver in the spider family Araneidae. It is found in the United States and Mexico.

References

Araneidae
Articles created by Qbugbot
Spiders described in 1942